In Bulgaria, the standard time is Eastern European Time (EET; UTC+02:00). Daylight saving time, which moves one hour ahead to UTC+03:00 is observed from the last Sunday in March to the last Sunday in October, inline with most EU member states.

History 
Bulgaria first observed daylight saying time between 1943 and 1944, and regularly since 1979.

Time notation 
Bulgarians commonly use the 24 hour clock. The clock is used exclusively on bus and train timetables.

IANA time zone database 
In the IANA time zone database, Bulgaria is given the zone Europe/Sofia:

See also 
Time in Europe
List of time zones by country
List of time zones by UTC offset

References

External links 
Current time in Bulgaria at Time.is